Port Sunlight is a model village in Wirral, Merseyside, England.  It contains 195 buildings that are recorded in the National Heritage List for England as designated listed buildings.   Of these, one is  listed at Grade I, the highest of the three grades, and the others are at Grade II, the lowest grade.  There are no buildings listed at Grade II*.

The model village of Port Sunlight was developed by William Lever (later 1st Viscount Leverhulme) to provide housing for the workers in the nearby soap-making factory of Lever Brothers.  The building of the factory started in 1888 with the help of William Owen, an architect from Warrington, where Lever previously had a factory, and the earliest houses were designed by Owen.  Over the next 35 years the village grew and more houses were built.

The houses were built in blocks, each block was surrounded by green space, and each family was provided with an allotment for growing their own food.  The houses were set in parkland, and public buildings were also constructed.  All the groups of houses were individually designed, and all were different from the others.  They were built in brick, stone, and half-timbering, and incorporated features from many architectural styles, including medieval, Jacobean, and Queen Anne, with English, French, Dutch, and Flemish influences.  The houses were built at the low density of seven per acre (compared with the 40 per acre required at the time by bye-laws).

Lever employed nearly 30 architects, but was involved in all the designs, vetting every one of them himself.  Most of the architects were local, but some London architects were also used.  Following his earliest commissions, Owen continued to design more houses and other buildings, later in partnership with his eldest son, Segar Owen.  The local architects mainly used were Grayson and Ould of Liverpool, John Douglas of Chester (in the partnerships of Douglas and Fordham and Douglas and Minshull), J. J. Talbot, and Wilson and Talbot of Liverpool.  T. M. Lockwood of Chester designed two groups of houses.  The architects from London included Maurice B. Adams, Ernest George and Yeates, Edwin Lutyens, and Ernest Newton.  Some of the earlier designs were by Lever's friend Jonathan Simpson, and after 1910 almost all the buildings were designed by his son, James Lomax-Simpson.

Lever also commissioned designs for public buildings in the village.  The earliest of these, Gladstone Hall (now the Gladstone Theatre) (1891), was originally a men's dining and recreation room by William and Segar Owen.  Douglas and Fordham designed the school known as the Lyceum (1894–96), and this was followed by the Lever Club (1896), a social club for men by Grayson and Ould.  The Bridge Inn (1900), also by Grayson and Ould, was built as a temperance hotel, and Hulme Hall (1901) by William and Segar Owen was a women's dining hall.  The primary school (1902–03) was designed by Grayson and Ould, Christ Church (1902–04), a Congregational church, is by the Owens, Hesketh Hall, a technical institute (1903), is by J. J. Talbot, and the cottage hospital (1905–07) (now a hotel) is by Grayson and Ould.  In 1913, a girl's club, now the visitors' centre, was designed by James Lomax-Simpson.  The largest public building in the village is the Lady Lever Art Gallery (1914–22), built as a memorial to Lady Lever and designed by the Owens.  Lever also commissioned a war memorial (1919–21) by W. Goscombe John.

Following Lever's death, the Leverhulme Memorial (1930) was erected near the Lady Lever Art Gallery; it was designed by James Lomax-Simpson with sculpture by William Reid Dick.  Other listed buildings in the village, aside from houses, include Dell Bridge (1894), a footbridge by Douglas and Fordham; the frontage of the factory, known as Lever House (1895), by the Owens; a group of four hostels for girls (1896), by Maxwell and Tuke of Bury, that was later used as a bank and heritage centre; a sculpture known as the sphinx (probably about 1896); the Silver Wedding Fountain (1899), built to celebrate the silver wedding of Lever and his wife; a pool (probably about 1913) with a fountain by Charles Wheeler added in 1949; a pair of telephone kiosks (1935) by Giles Gilbert Scott; and an arch and the walls surrounding the rose garden (about 1937) by James Lomax-Simpson.


Key

Buildings

References

Citations

Sources

Listed buildings in Merseyside
Lists of listed buildings in Merseyside